Don Jacobo Felipe Carlos Fitz-James Stuart y Stolberg-Gedern, 5th Duke of Liria and Jérica, 5th Duke of Berwick, Grandee of Spain (Paris, 25 February 1773 – Madrid, 3 April 1794) was a Jacobite and Spanish nobleman. On 24 January 1790 he married María Teresa Fernández de Silva y Palafox, (10 March 1772 – Florence, Italy, 29 April 1818, aged 46), daughter of Pedro Fernández de Silva, 10th duque de Híjar, and Rafaela de Palafox and sister of José Rafael de Silva Fernández de Híjar.

Their two surviving sons became 6th Duke and 7th Duke, successively.

1773 births
1794 deaths
Berwick, Jacobo Fitz-James Stuart, 5th Duke of
Dukes of Spain
Grandees of Spain
Counts of Spain